Datsan is the term used for Buddhist university monasteries in the Tibetan tradition of Gelukpa located throughout Mongolia, Tibet and Siberia. As a rule, in a datsan there are two departments—philosophical and medical. Sometimes to them is added the department of the tantric practices where the monks study only after finishing education in the philosophical department. 

In pre-revolutionary Russia, datsans traditionally existed only in the Buryat territories, most of those now included in Buryatia and Transbaikalia (a number of datsans there has been reconstructed or started since the early 1990s). There was a difference with Tibetan administrative idea: in Tibet, several datsans were education-centered parts of larger organizations, as Drepung, Ganden, and Sera Monastery in Gelugpa tradition. In Russia, datsans were not parts of a larger entity, but rather independent educational and religious centers. In Buryat Buddhism, terms "Buddhist monastery" and "Datsan" are interchangeable, as other monastery organization forms found in Tibetan Buddhism elsewhere, were not present.

List of datsans in Mongolia
Manba Datsan (also “Mamba Datsan“)

List of datsans in Russia
Datsans were officially acknowledged in Imperial Russia in 1734. By statute of 1853 there were two recognized datsans in the Irkutsk government and others in the Zabaykalsky Government. The first datsan in Europe was Datsan Gunzechoinei in St. Petersburg.

Between 1927 and 1938 all 47 datsans existed in Buryatia and Transbaikalia were closed or destroyed. In 1945 the Ivolginsky datsan was opened, and several years later the Aginsky datsan resumed operations.  The following ten datsans were not opened until 1991.

Khambyn Khure datsan (Улан-Удэнский Дацан Хамбын Хурэ) in Ulan-Ude
Aginsky datsan (Агинский Дацан) in Aginskoye
Kurumkansky datsan (Курумканский Дацан) in Kurumkan
Sartul-Gegetuy datsan (Сартул-Гэгэтуйский дацан) in Gegetuy
Egituysky datsan (Эгитуйский Дацан) in Egituy
Sanaginsky datsan (Санагинский  Дацан) in Sanaga
Ivolginsky datsan (Иволгинский Дацан) in Verkhnyaya Ivolga
Kizhinginsky datsan (Кижингинский Дацан) in Kizhinga
Baldan Breybun datsan (Дацан Балдан Брэйбун) in Murochi
Tugnuysky datsan (Тугнуйский дацан) in Mukhorshibir
Okinsky datsan (Окинский дацан) in Orlik
Tamchinsky datsan (Тамчинский дацан) in Gusinoye Ozero
Kyrensky datsan (Кыренский дацан) in Kyren
Khoymorsky datsan (Хойморский дацан) in Arshan
Ugdansky datsan (Угданский дацан)
Tseezhe-Burgaltaysky datsan (Цээжэ-Бургалтайский дацан)
Ust-Ordynsky datsan (Усть-Ордынский (Абатанатский) дацан) in Ust-Ordynsky
Aninsky datsan (Анинский дацан) in Ana
Chesansky datsan (Чесанский дацан) in Chesan
Tsugolsky datsan (Цугольский дацан) in Tsugol
Saint Petersburg Tibetan Temple 
 Gunzechoyney datsan (Дацан Гунзэчойнэй) in Saint Petersburg
 Wat Phra Dhammakaya Mocow, Moscow, Russia
 Yakutsky datsan (Якутский дацан; дацан в Якутске) in Yakutsk, republic of Sakha (Yakutia). The northernmost Buddhist temple in the world

See also
List of Tibetan monasteries
Buddhism in the Russian Federation
Buddhism in Buryatia
Buddhism in Kalmykia

References

External links
 (List of datsans in Buryatia, Chita and Irkutsk Oblasts)
 Official site of the Gunzechoyney datsan
 (datsans)

 
Tibetan Buddhism in Siberia
Buddhist monasteries in Russia
Buddhist education